A. Laser is an Indian politician and incumbent member of the Tamil Nadu Legislative Assembly from the Periyakulam constituency. He represents the Communist Party of India (Marxist) party.

References

Members of the Tamil Nadu Legislative Assembly
Communist Party of India (Marxist) politicians from Tamil Nadu
Living people
Year of birth missing (living people)
Missing middle or first names